"Bus durch London" is a song by Austrian recording artist Christina Stürmer. It was written by Maya Singh and produced by Alexander Kahr for her second studio album, Soll das wirklich alles sein?. The song was released as the album's second single in August 2004, and reached number five on the Austrian Singles Chart.

Formats and track listings

Charts

References

External links
 

2004 singles
Christina Stürmer songs
Polydor Records singles
2004 songs